Local elections were held in the Mexican state of  Yucatán on May 20, 2007. Voters went to the polls to elect on the local level:

a new Governor of Yucatán to serve for a five-year term;
106 municipal presidents (mayors) to serve for a three-year term; and
25 local deputies (15 by the first-past-the-post system and 10 by proportional representation) to serve for a three-year term in the Congress of Yucatán.

Gubernatorial election
Nine political parties participated in the 2007 Yucatán state election, originally three parties (PRD, C and PT) decided to run together as a coalition but on February 11, 2007, the PRD decided to withdraw their support to the Convergence-Labor Party candidate.

After losing the candidacy in the PAN primaries, Ana Rosa Payán accepted the candidacy for the Todos Somos Yucatán coalition. 15 members of the PAN were also incarcerated after removing advertising material supporting non-PAN candidates and for exchanging cash for voting cards.

Opposition parties had accused both the federal and state governments of using public funds and publicly funded programs to support the PAN candidate. In response to this issue, the federal government decided to freeze all social programs on May 14, 2007, until after the elections.

Election results

Gubernatorial election

Congressional elections

See also
2007 Mexican elections

References

External links
Electoral Institute of Yucatán website
PREP (Programa de Resultados Electorales Preliminares) 2007

2007 elections in Mexico
Yucatán elections